Evelyn Brent (born Mary Elizabeth Riggs; October 20, 1895 – June 4, 1975) was an American film and stage actress.

Early life 
Brent was born in Tampa, Florida, and known as Betty. When she was age 10, her mother Eleanor (née. Warner) died, leaving her father Arthur to raise her alone.

She moved to New York City as a teenager, and her good looks brought modeling jobs that led to an opportunity to become involved in movies.

She originally studied to be a teacher. While attending a normal school in New York, she visited the World Film Studio in Fort Lee, New Jersey. Two days later, she was working there as an extra, earning $3 per day.

Career 
She began her film career working under her own name at a New Jersey film studio, then made her major debut in the 1915 silent film production of the Robert W. Service poem The Shooting of Dan McGrew.

As Evelyn Brent, she continued to work in film, developing into a young woman with sultry looks. After World War I, she went to London for a vacation and met American playwright Oliver Cromwell, who urged her to accept an important role in The Ruined Lady. The production was presented on the London stage. She remained in England for four years, performing on stage and in films produced by British companies, then she moved to Hollywood in 1922.

Her career received a major boost the following year when she was chosen as one of the WAMPAS Baby Stars. Douglas Fairbanks Sr. signed her but failed to find a story for her; she left his company to join Associated Authors.

 
Brent made more than two dozen silent films, including three for director Josef von Sternberg. One of these was The Last Command (1928), an epic war drama featuring William Powell for which Emil Jannings won the first Academy Award for Best Actor. Brent played the film's leading lady. 

Later that year, she starred opposite William Powell in her first sound movie. Brent played major roles in several features, most notably The Silver Horde and the Paramount Pictures all-star revue Paramount on Parade (both 1930).

By the early part of the 1930s, she was working in secondary roles in a variety of films as well as touring with vaudeville shows. In 1936, she played William Boyd's love interest/femme fatale in Hopalong Cassidy Returns. However, by 1941, she was no longer in demand by major studios, and she found work at smaller, low-budget studios.

She photographed attractively opposite leading men who were also at advanced ages and later stages in their careers: Neil Hamilton in Producers Releasing Corporation's production Dangerous Lady, Lee Tracy in the same studio's The Payoff, and Jack Holt in the serial Holt of the Secret Service. In the early 1940s, she worked in action features for Paramount releases. Veteran director William Beaudine cast her in many productions as well, including Emergency Landing (1941), Bowery Champs (1944), The Golden Eye (1948), and Again Pioneers (1950). After performing in more than 120 films, she retired from acting in 1950 and worked for a number of years as an actor's agent.

She returned to acting in television's Wagon Train for one episode in 1960, "The Lita Foladaire Story", starring Ward Bond and Diane Brewster. Brent played a housekeeper and her appearance had changed radically by that juncture.

Personal life and death 
Evelyn Brent was married three times: to movie executive Bernard P. Fineman, to producer Harry D. Edwards, and finally to the vaudeville actor Harry Fox. They were married until he died in 1959.

Brent died of a heart attack in 1975 at age 79 in her Los Angeles home. She is interred in the San Fernando Mission Cemetery in Mission Hills, California.

Legacy
In 1960, Brent was inducted into the Hollywood Walk of Fame with a motion pictures star for her contributions to the film industry. Her star is located at 6548 Hollywood Boulevard.

Filmography

References

Bibliography
 The New York Times, Evelyn Brent, 75, Film Star of 1920s, June 8, 1975, Page 55.

External links 

 
 
 Photographs of Evelyn Brent
 

1895 births
1975 deaths
American film actresses
American silent film actresses
American stage actresses
Vaudeville performers
American television actresses
Actresses from Tampa, Florida
20th-century American actresses
Burials at San Fernando Mission Cemetery
Paramount Pictures contract players
WAMPAS Baby Stars